Ultimate Guitar (Ultimate Guitar USA LLC), which is also known as Ultimate-Guitar.com or simply UG, is an online platform for guitarists and musicians. Its website and mobile application provides guitar tablature catalogues and chord sheets. UG's platform also includes video courses, reviews of music and equipment, interviews with notable musicians and forums. It was started on October 9, 1998, by Eugeny Naidenov. Since 2008, Ultimate Guitar operates from San Francisco, US, with its platform available in most of the countries. As of December 2021, the site and mobile app contain 1,600,000 tabs and chords for over 900,000 songs from over 115,000 artists.  UG app (also known as 'Tabs') has been downloaded more than 53,000,000 times.

Community
UG has over 38 million registered users. It is a strong community of forum users who frequent the site. The website is regulated by an administrator and moderators. Moderators are users who are rewarded for being particularly helpful and knowledgeable in a specific subject and are responsible for moderating forums that focus on the subject they specialize in. Inappropriate words used to be censored by a computer that searched for and replaced undesired words posted within the community, until September 1, 2015, when censorship of curse and swear words was lifted on the website. Community members may also create guitar lessons, and have their approved works published on the website and read by its users. Reviews of albums, DVDs, or gear and news articles can also be submitted by members.

Like the tabs, the lessons and columns are also rated by users, which attributes towards UG Points (or rather number of contributions), users' UG score also increases, or decreases as the members rate their contribution.

Although UG encourages participation, they also have a strict guideline and set of rules that all UG users must follow. Members must be over the age of 13 to use the services offered by the site and only one account is allowed to be made per person. Strong media is also prohibited from use on the site.

Some members of the community have collaborated with other fellow users to develop musical projects via the website's forums and some of these community projects have been released as compilation albums. One of the most notable of these recent projects was the "Blues & Jazz Album II", which featured fourteen original tracks submitted by a number of community members, released for digital download with all profits going to Tipitina's Foundation. The project's community page can be found here, and the digital download is available on iTunes. There have been several other collaborative albums made by community members that are available for free download within the forums, including two electronic albums, a rock album and an acoustic album.

Features
The Pit is the part of the site where the registered UGers can discuss multiple topics, including those that do not necessarily have to do with guitar or even music, including political, religious and topical issues. Although The Pit is a miscellaneous section, all standards are upheld.

On August 12, 2007, the Ultimate Guitar site launched "UG Profiles", a feature which allowed users to add profiles for each of their bands, upload pictures of themselves, as well as gear, display their "guitar skills", join groups of interest, and add other users to friends lists. This was intended for networking, advertising gear, and bands in a similar way to other sites such as MySpace. At one time the site featured MP3 functionality, allowing users to upload their own recordings to their profiles, however that feature was disabled due to lack of use and legal liability in the case of copyright violations. The MP3 functionality was removed some time before September 1, 2014.

Users are able to request tablature in the site's Tab Talk forum. Tabs can be voted from 1 star (the worst) to 5 stars (the best), and comments can be made about the tab. Tabs of entire albums can also be submitted. Files such as basic guitar tabs and bass tabs can be read from an Internet browser, or copied and viewed off-line in a text editor in ASCII format. Guitar Pro and Power Tab files are run through programs that can play the tablature. These files can be saved and opened on the user's computer. Tabs are searchable by artist, album, or song name. Songs in non-European languages are often romanized.

Relationships with music publishers and songwriters
In late 2004 to early 2005, after taborama and mxtabs.net began closing due to legal threats from the Music Publishers Association of America, UG saw a surge of new users flock to the community. UG argued that it was not subject to the MPA legal actions because its headquarters were in Russia and the site’s practices complied with Russian laws. Since then, UG has signed license agreements with thousands of publishers, including Sony, EMI, Peermusic, Alfred, Hal Leonard, Faber and Music Sales, through which the songwriters receive compensation for the display of the tabs.

On April 10, 2010, Ultimate Guitar entered an additional licensing agreement with Harry Fox Agency. The agreement included rights for lyrics display, title search and tablature display with download and print capabilities. HFA's over 44,000 represented publishers have the opportunity to opt into the licensing arrangement with UG.

See also 
 List of Internet forums

References

External links

Community websites
Online archives
Guitar websites
Internet properties established in 1998